This is a timeline of battles and other events of the Finnish War (1808–1809). The dates are according to the Gregorian (Western European) calendar. Russian sources might refer to Julian calendar dates.

Finnish War